Mario Castro (23 September 1923 – 18 September 1983) was a Chilean footballer. He played in twelve matches for the Chile national football team from 1945 to 1953. He was also part of Chile's squad for the 1945 South American Championship.

References

External links
 

1923 births
1983 deaths
Chilean footballers
Chile international footballers
Place of birth missing
Association football midfielders
Santiago Morning footballers
Colo-Colo footballers